Eleni is the 1985 film adaptation of the memoir Eleni by Greek-American journalist Nicholas Gage. Directed by Peter Yates with a screenplay by Steve Tesich, the film stars John Malkovich, Kate Nelligan, Linda Hunt and Glenne Headly.

Plot
The film is told in a flashback format with Gage, now living in the United States, returning to his native Greece to solve the mystery of his mother's death when he was a child. The film looks back to the effect of the 1940s Greek Civil War in Lia – the remote Greek village of Gage's upbringing in the northwestern Greek region of Epirus; and in particular, the murder of his mother by communist guerrillas of the
Democratic Army of Greece (ΔΣΕ).

Cast
Kate Nelligan as Eleni Gatzoyiannis
John Malkovich as Nicholas Gage
Linda Hunt as Katina
Oliver Cotton as Katis
Ronald Pickup as Spiro Skevis
Rosalie Crutchley as Grandmother
Glenne Headly as Joan Gage
Dimitra Arliss as Ana

See also
Red Terror
Democratic Army of Greece
OPLA

References

External links

1985 films
American political drama films
American war drama films
Films based on non-fiction books
Films directed by Peter Yates
Films set in Epirus
Films set in Greece
Films shot in Greece
Films set in the United States
Films shot in the United States
Films set in the 1940s
Films set in the 1980s
Warner Bros. films
1980s political drama films
CBS Theatrical Films films
Films scored by Bruce Smeaton
1980s war drama films
1985 drama films
1980s English-language films
1980s American films